Bento de Moura Portugal (21 March 1702 – 27 January 1766) was a Portuguese aristocrat, a Knight of the Order of Christ, and a scientist best known for his improvements to Thomas Savery's steam engine. He was an early supporter of Newtonian science and became known as the Portuguese Newton.

Life 
Moura Portugal was born in Moimenta da Serra, Portugal. In 1741 he was elected to the Royal Society in London.

In 1742 he demonstrated his improved steam engine, based on that of Thomas Savery, to the Portuguese court in Lisbon. In 1747 he was tried and found guilty of proposições heréticas e escandalosas for the assembly of such "fire machines"  by the Inquisition, and spent the rest of his life going gradually insane in Junqueira Prison in Lisbon.

References 

1702 births
1766 deaths
Portuguese scientists
Fellows of the Royal Society